Gholam-Abbas Tavassoli (23 May 1935 – 16 October 2020) was an Iranian sociologist, emeritus at University of Tehran and chancellor of Isfahan University.

Tavassoli was a senior member of the Freedom Movement of Iran.

References

1935 births
2020 deaths
Iranian sociologists
University of Paris alumni
Academic staff of the University of Tehran
Freedom Movement of Iran politicians
National Front (Iran) student activists
Members of the Association for Defense of Freedom and the Sovereignty of the Iranian Nation
People from Razavi Khorasan Province